Jesús Rueda Ambrosio (born 19 February 1987) is a Spanish professional footballer who plays as a central defender or defensive midfielder for CD San Roque de Lepe.

He spent most of his career with Valladolid, playing 163 competitive matches mostly in Segunda División.

Club career

Valladolid
Born in Corte de Peleas, Province of Badajoz, Extremadura, Rueda played youth football with Real Valladolid. He made his senior debut with the reserve team, spending four full seasons with the side in the Segunda División B; on 12 November 2008 he made his first official appearance with the main squad, featuring 34 minutes in a 2–2 draw against Hércules CF in the round of 32 of the Copa del Rey, and his first La Liga match was on the following 26 April, also at the Estadio Nuevo José Zorrilla, a 0–0 draw with CA Osasuna in which he came on as a late substitute.

After spending the 2009–10 campaign on loan to Córdoba CF of Segunda División, Rueda returned to Valladolid which were now in the same level. He totalled 3,867 minutes of action in the second year in his second spell – playoffs included – scoring in the 1–1 draw at Recreativo de Huelva on 15 October 2011 as the Castile and León side went on to return to the top flight.

Later career
On 13 August 2015, after appearing regularly as the club fluctuated between the first and second tiers, Rueda terminated his contract with the Blanquivioletas. He subsequently moved abroad for the first time, receiving offers from teams in Bulgaria and Israel, eventually signing for Beitar Jerusalem F.C. and becoming a regular in the Holy Land team alongside compatriot Pablo de Lucas; manager Slobodan Drapić stated "I wish I had eleven like Rueda", and he was among a growing contingent of Spaniards playing in the relatively obscure Israeli Premier League, gaining media attention back home.

Rueda moved countries again in June 2017, when he signed a two-year deal for APOEL FC of the Cypriot First Division, a club whose director Juanjo Lorenzo was from Valladolid. His debut season in Nicosia ended at the halfway point when he suffered a knee injury in training, ruling him out for six months.

On 21 July 2019, free agent Rueda returned to Spain and joined second division team Extremadura UD. The following 25 January, after only five official games, he cut ties with the club and signed a 18-month contract with third-tier Gimnàstic de Tarragona four days later.

On 5 August 2021, Rueda signed a one-year deal with UD Logroñés, recently relegated to the Primera División RFEF.

Club statistics

References

External links

1987 births
Living people
People from Tierra de Barros
Sportspeople from the Province of Badajoz
Spanish footballers
Footballers from Extremadura
Association football defenders
Association football midfielders
Association football utility players
La Liga players
Segunda División players
Segunda División B players
Primera Federación players
Segunda Federación players
Real Valladolid Promesas players
Real Valladolid players
Córdoba CF players
Extremadura UD footballers
Gimnàstic de Tarragona footballers
UD Logroñés players
Zamora CF footballers
CD San Roque de Lepe footballers
Israeli Premier League players
Beitar Jerusalem F.C. players
Cypriot First Division players
APOEL FC players
Spanish expatriate footballers
Expatriate footballers in Israel
Expatriate footballers in Cyprus
Spanish expatriate sportspeople in Israel
Spanish expatriate sportspeople in Cyprus